Neeru Khosla (born 1955/1956) is the co-founder and chair of the non-profit CK12 Foundation.

Early life
Having grown up in India and England, Khosla wanted to be a doctor. She had an aptitude for science, but the prerequisite for medicine of animal dissection pushed her to pursue microbiology instead.

Khosla focused her studies in India on science and moved to the U.S. shortly after marrying Vinod Khosla in 1980. Around the time he co-founded Sun Microsystems, she earned a master's degree in molecular biology from San Jose State University. Soon, she started a job studying gene expression at Stanford University. She also has a master's degree in education from the Stanford Graduate School of Education.

Career
In December 2008, it was announced that Khosla had been appointed to the Wikimedia Foundation advisory board. She has been on the boards of other organizations including the American India Foundation and DonorsChoose.

Personal life
She is married to the billionaire engineer and venture capitalist Vinod Khosla, her childhood boyfriend. They have four children.

References

External links
O'Reilly TOC Conference 2008
Neeru Khosla on Education and Doing a Start-Up

Year of birth missing (living people)
Living people
San Jose State University alumni
Wikimedia Foundation Advisory Board members
Stanford Graduate School of Education alumni
1950s births